The Huawei Nova 7i is an Android smartphone manufactured by Huawei as part of its mid-range Nova series. The phone was released on 14 February 2020.

Specifications

Display and camera 
Huawei Nova 7i has a 6.4-inch IPS LCD screen with a 1080p resolution and a 19.5:9 aspect ratio. It has a total of five cameras: 48MP, 8MP, 2MP, 2MP with PDAF and flash on the back and 16MP on the front.

Storage and configuration 
The phone comes with 128GB of internal storage, which can be expanded up to 256GB. It is powered by Huawei's HiSilicon Kirin 810 (7 nm) chipset paired with 8GB of RAM. It has a side-mounted fingerprint scanner for improved security.

Battery and connectivity 
The phone comes with a 4200 mAh Li-ion battery, a USB-C charging port, and a 3.5 mm audio jack for wired headphones. It supports 4G connectivity.

Software 
The phone was shipped with Android 10 overlaid with Huawei's EMUI 10. However, the phone is now upgradeable to Huawei's EMUI 12.

Color variants 
This model comes in three colours: Midnight Black, Crush Green, Sakura Pink

References 

Huawei smartphones
Discontinued smartphones
Mobile phones introduced in 2020